Stojčići is a village in the municipality of Olovo, Bosnia and Herzegovina.

Demographics 
According to the 2013 census, its population was 182.

References

Populated places in Olovo